Ariz may refer to:

Places

Spain
 Ariz (Basauri), Biscay, Basque Country, Spain, a neighborhood
 Ariz (Metro Bilbao), a metro station serving Ariz

Portugal
 Ariz, a parish in Marco de Canaveses, Porto, Portugal
 Ariz, a parish in Moimenta da Beira, Viseu, Portugal

Turkey
 Arız, Karacabey, a village in the Bursa Province, Turkey,
 Arız, Kastamonu, a village in the Kastamonu Province, Turkey,

Lebanon
 Ariz, Bsharri District, Lebanon

Abbreviations
 Ariz., an abbreviated form of Arizona

Other uses
 ARIZ, Russian acronym of алгоритм решения изобретательских задач (АРИЗ) (algorithm of inventive problems solving)

See also
 Aris (disambiguation)